Gmelinite-Na is one of the rarer zeolites but the most common member of the gmelinite series, gmelinite-Ca, gmelinite-K and gmelinite-Na.  It is closely related to the very similar mineral chabazite. Gmelinite was named as a single species in 1825 after Christian Gottlob Gmelin (1792–1860) professor of chemistry and mineralogist from Tübingen, Germany, and in 1997 it was raised to the status of a series.Gmelinite-Na has been synthesised from Na-bearing aluminosilicate gels.  The naturally occurring mineral forms striking crystals, shallow, six sided double pyramids, which can be colorless, white, pale yellow, greenish, orange, pink, and red. They have been compared to an angular flying saucer.

Structure 

The aluminosilicate framework is composed of tetrahedra linked to form parallel double six-membered rings stacked in two different positions (A and B) in the repeating arrangement AABBAABB.  The framework has no Al-Si order.  Within the structure there are cavities with a cross-section of up to 4 Å, and also wide channels parallel to the c axis with a diameter of 6.4 Å. Space group: P63/mmc.  Unit cell parameters: a=13.72 Å, c=9.95 Å, Z=4.

Environment 

Generally occurs in Si-poor volcanic rocks, marine basalts and breccias, associated with other sodium zeolites such as analcime, natrolite, and chabazite-Na, .  It also occurs in Na-rich pegmatites in alkaline rocks, and as an alteration product in some nepheline syenite intrusions.  No sedimentary gmelinite has been found.  It is generally assumed that it forms at low temperatures, less than 100 °C. It is widespread as a hydrothermal alteration product of ussingite, associated with gobbinsite, gonnardite, and chabazite-K.

Notable localities 
 
Gmelinite-Na occurs extremely rarely at the Francon Quarry, Montreal, Canada, in sills of the igneous volcanic rock phonolite which are rich in dawsonite, . It occurs both as pure gmelinite-Na and interlayered with chabazite in water-quenched basalts in Western Tasmania.

Associated minerals include other zeolites, especially chabazite, quartz, aragonite and calcite.

Distribution 
Type Locality: Monte Nero, San Pietro, Montecchio Maggiore, Vicenza Province, Veneto, Italy.  Also found in Australia, Canada, Czech Republic, Germany, Hungary, Japan, Russia, UK and US.

References

External links 
Structure type GME
Mineral galleries
Mindat

Sodium minerals
Calcium minerals
Aluminium minerals
Zeolites
Hexagonal minerals
Minerals in space group 194